T-cell receptor-associated transmembrane adapter 1 is a protein that in humans is encoded by the TRAT1 gene.

References

Further reading